Antonio Malvassi (born 1904, date of death unknown) was an Argentine cyclist. He competed in the sprint event at the 1928 Summer Olympics.

References

External links
 

1904 births
Year of death missing
Argentine male cyclists
Olympic cyclists of Argentina
Cyclists at the 1928 Summer Olympics
Place of birth missing